Steve Truglia (3 October 1962 – 17 November 2016) was a stunt coordinator, stunt performer and action unit director in the UK. He became a TED speaker in 2009. Truglia died while attempting to abseil from a helicopter.

Career 
Truglia served as a reservist in the UK Special Forces for twenty years.

Truglia became a professional stuntman in 1996. His motion picture stunt credits included Saving Private Ryan and two James Bond films.

Truglia set multiple records, including:
The longest Full Body Burn in the UK, ablaze for 2 minutes 5 seconds (unofficial record).
British record (2002) for no limits freediving (breath hold diving) – .
Awarded Guinness World Record in 2004 for fastest abseil over  (8.9 seconds).

Truglia made a fundraising attempt for a world-record high altitude parachute jump from the edge of space, to surpass what was then Joe Kittinger's 1960 record. He did not attempt the stunt prior to his death.

Death  
Truglia died on 17 November 2016 while attempting a world record  speed abseil from a helicopter above Chongqing.

See also
Parachuting
Yevgeni Andreyev
Felix Baumgartner
Charles "Nish" Bruce
Alan Eustace
Michel Fournier
Joseph Kittinger
Nick Piantanida
Cheryl Stearns

References

External links
 Official stunt website, archived 7 March 2016
 Card Shark Show website, archived 20 November 2016
 Stars of Vegas website
 Space Jump website, archived 19 September 2015
 IMDB Profile, archived 17 February 2017

Media 
Article in The Times Jan 2010
A video of a talk in July 2009 at the TED Global Conference in Oxford, UK about technological improvements in stunts and his forthcoming parachute jump from the edge of space, in his own words, "...the greatest stunt on earth."
  breaks World's largest Loop the Loop Car Stunt
 High Fall Nominated for TV Award Article
  Freediving Article
 Stunts in TV Reconstruction of SAS Siege for Discovery Newspaper Article
  Interviewed for Times Newspaper Stunt Article
  Feature Article on Autotrader Website
  Feature Article on James Bond Fan Website
 EyeForFilm.co.uk interview September 2007
Card Shark Show in The Independent

1962 births
2016 deaths
Military personnel from London
Accidental deaths from falls
Accidental deaths in the People's Republic of China
Bodyguards
British Army Commandos soldiers
British freedivers
British skydivers
British stunt performers
English people of Italian descent
Royal Artillery soldiers
Special Boat Service personnel
Sportspeople from London